Joshua Charles Pence (born June 8, 1982) is an American actor.

Career
Pence first appeared in the 2006 film The Good Shepherd in an uncredited role as Bonesman. Pence appeared in the 2010 film The Social Network as Tyler Winklevoss, alongside Armie Hammer. Pence played the part of Tyler Winklevoss during filming and Hammer's face was grafted onto Pence's body in post-production to create the illusion of identical twins. Split-screen photography was also used. He also played Cameron Winklevoss in certain scenes, for particular setups. Pence also appears in a separate cameo role elsewhere in the film.

In 2012, Pence portrayed a naval petty officer in the film Battleship, alongside Liam Neeson (with whom he previously worked with when he portrayed Young Ra's al Ghul in Christopher Nolan's film The Dark Knight Rises).

In June 2012, Pence signed on as an ambassador to global aid agency Mercy Corps, blogging for The Huffington Post about his first trip to Haiti.

Pence also appeared in the 2013 crime film Gangster Squad as Daryl Gates, as well as in the 2014 sports drama film Draft Day.

Pence is currently part of the main cast of Freeform‘s spin-off of The Fosters, Good Trouble. He plays Dennis.

Filmography

Film

Television

References

External links
 

1982 births
21st-century American male actors
American male film actors
American male television actors
Living people
Male actors from Santa Monica, California